This is a list of earthquakes in 1951. Only magnitude 6.0 or greater earthquakes appear on the list. Lower magnitude events are included if they have caused death, injury or damage. Events which occurred in remote areas will be excluded from the list as they wouldn't have generated significant media interest. All dates are listed according to UTC time. Once again a very active year. One major series of earthquakes in Taiwan in October and November helped towards the upheaval. This series resulted in around 85 deaths in all. The main quakes causing most of the deaths shook neighboring parts of Central America with El Salvador in May (1,100 deaths) and Nicaragua in August (1,000 deaths) being affected. Aside from this activity China, Russia and the southwest Pacific Islands saw magnitude 7.0+ quakes. Malaysia's North Borneo Sabah saw the biggest quake in its history with a magnitude 6.4, which killed 6 peoples in Kudat including 4 children.

Overall

By death toll 

 Note: At least 10 casualties

By magnitude 

 Note: At least 7.0 magnitude

Notable events

January

February

March

April

May

June

July

August

September

October

November

December

References

1951
 
1951